Matt Green (born March 27, 1967 in Queens, New York, United States) is an American keyboard player, songwriter and producer, best known for his association with the Los Angeles-based electronic-industrial music group Spahn Ranch from 1992 to 2000. Aside from his work with Spahn Ranch, Green produced several other albums as well as remixing over 70 records for various artists.

Spahn Ranch discography
Sphan Ranch (1992), Cleopatra (US)
Collatoral Damage (1993), Cleopatra (US)
Collatoral (1993), Zoth Ommog (Germany)
The Blackmail Starters Kit (1994), Cleopatra (US)
 Breath and Taxes (1994), Zoth Ommog (Germany)
The Coiled One (1995), Cleopatra (US)
In Parts Soley (1996), Cleopatra (US)
Architecture (1997), Cleopatra (US)
Architecture: Beta (1997), Out Of Line (Germany)
Retrofit (1998), Cleopatra (US), Out Of Line (Germany)
 Limited Edition 12" - first 4 tracks from Retrofit (1998), Cleopatra (US)
Beat Noir (1998), Cleopatra (US), Out Of Line (Germany)
Anthology 1992-1994 (2000), Cleopatra (US)
Closure (2001), Cleopatra (US), Cryonica (UK)

Non-Spahn Ranch production and remix discography

Production
 Sex Gang Children - Medea LP (1993)
 Car Crash International - Fragments Of A Journal In Hell LP (1993)
 Sex Gang Children - Ecstasy & Vendetta Over New York LP (1994), 4 tracks mixed
 Eva O - Past Time LP (1994), 2 tracks produced
 Robert Calvert - Freq LP (1994), additional production & mix
 Makina - Red LP (1996)

Remixes
 Penal Colony - "Blue 9" (Sin Trip mix), w/Judson Leach 1994
 Psychic TV - "I Believe What You Said" (Spahn Ranch mix), 1995
 Christian Death - "Death in Detroit (Turning In His Grave), 1995
 Christian Death - "Cervix Couch (One By One), 1995
 Birmingham 6 - "Police State" (Spahn Ranch mix), 1995
 Alien Factor - "Ego Death" (Beaten To Death), 1996
 Kraftwelt - "Deranged" (Coercion mix), 1996
 The Damned - "No More Tears" (Spahn Ranch Mix), 1996
 The Damned - "Shut It" (mix), w/Paul Raven 1996
 Pygmy Children - "Collapser" (Spahn Ranch mix), 1996
 Switchblade Symphony - "Sweet" (Spahn Ranch mix), 1996
 Switchblade Symphony - "Dollhouse" (Damned mix), w/Rat Scabies 1996
 Jeff Ernst - "Pin" (Spahn Ranch mix), 1996
 The NewlyDeads - "In Denial" (Spahn Ranch mix), 1997
 The NewlyDeads - "Skin Tight Skin" (Spahn Ranch mix), 1997
 The Electric Hellfire Club - "He Who Holds The Lightning Rod" (Ranchero remix), 1997
 Inertia - "Cryonica" (Spahn Ranch mix), 1997
 La Concepcion De La Luna - "Corazon Negro" (Spahn Ranch mix), 1997
 Gary Numan - "Cars" (Spahn Ranch mix), 1997
 The Flys - "Gods of Basketball" - 2 mixes (Remix & Dub), w/Paul Raven 1997
 Pigface - "Burundi" (Spahn Ranch mix), 1997
 Information Society - "Think" (Spahn Ranch mix), 1997
 Gene Loves Jezebel - "Motion of Love" (Spahn Ranch mix), 1998
 Heaven 17 - "That's No Lie" (Spahn Ranch mix), 1998
 Bow Wow Wow - "W.O.R.K." (Spahn Ranch mix), 1998
 Sonic Adventure featuring Corey Glover - "Believe in Myself (Theme of Miles)", 1998
 Cinderella - "Gypsy Road" (Spahn Ranch mix), 1998
 A Flock of Seagulls - "Rainfall" (Spahn Ranch mix), 1999
 Bob Marley and the Wailers - "Mr Brown" (Spahn Ranch mix), 1999
 Berlin - "Dancing in Berlin" (Spahn Ranch mix), 1999
 Fizzybangers - "Everybody" (Spahn Ranch remix), 1999
 James LaBrie/Dream Theatre - "Vision" (remix), 1999
 Pearl - "Blackdog" (remix), 1999
 Steve Rochelle - "You're Crazy" (Spahn Ranch mix), 1999
 Love/Hate - "Looks" (Spahn Ranch mix), 1999
 Ryan R. - "Surrender" (Spahn Ranch mix), 1999
 Bob Marley and the Wailers - 9 mixes on Mystic Mixes CD, 1999
 Santana - "Jingo" (2000 remix), 1999
 Santana - "Neckbones" (2000 remix), 1999
 Marilyn Monroe - "Diamonds" (Goldiggers mix), w/Mark Blasquez 1999
 The Association - "Windy" (Santa Ana mix), 1999
 Hawkwind - "Hurry On Sundown" (Sunset dub), 2000
 Horace Andy - "Don't Stop" (A Non Stop Version), 2000
 Horace Andy - "Repatriation" (Black Star Liner Version), 2000
 Horace Andy - "Angel" (You Are My Version), 2000
 Horace Andy - "Something On My Mind" (Every Way Version), 2000
 Electric Hellfire Club - "Unholy Roller" (Spahn Ranch mix), w/Mark Blasquez 2000
 Electric Hellfire Club - "Speed Demon" (Spahn Ranch mix), 2000
 Andrea True Connection - "More More More" (MakeUp mix), w/DJ Jason Lavitt 2000
 The Ventures - "Walk Don't Run" (Jaywalking mix), 2000
 Todd Rundgren - "Emperor Of The Highway" (No Clothes Mix), 2000
 Santana - "Let's Get Ourselves Together" (millennium remix), 2000
 Santana - "As The Years Go By" (millennium remix), 2000
 Cruciform Injection - "Exorcise The Living" (Spahn Ranch mix), 2000
 L.A. Guns - "Rip N Tear" (Spahn Ranch mix), 2000
 Taime Downe - "Hellbent" (Spahn Ranch mix), 2000
 Kill Switch Klick - "Kontorted/Kontortion" (Spahn Ranch mix), 2000 

1967 births
Living people
American keyboardists
Record producers from New York (state)